Step Down to Terror (also known as The Silent Stranger) is a 1958 American film noir crime film directed by Harry Keller and starring Colleen Miller, Charles Drake and Rod Taylor. It is a remake of the 1943 Alfred Hitchcock film Shadow of a Doubt.

Plot
Johnny Williams (Drake) is a psychotic serial killer who returns to his hometown to visit his mother (Hutchinson) and widowed sister-in-law Helen (Miller), both of whom are ignorant of his criminal past. Johnny hopes to settle down and start life anew, but Helen, her suspicions aroused by visiting detective Mike Randall (Taylor), discovers the truth about her beloved brother-in-law. Failing to talk Helen out of turning him in, Johnny methodically plots her murder. When all his plans fail he drags Helen into his car and drives off with her. Knowing Johnny is going to kill her, Helen grabs the keys, and he is forced to swerve to avoid hitting a boy riding his bike, and is killed in the resulting accident. At the memorial service, as Johnny is lauded as a model citizen, only Helen and Mike know the real truth.

Cast
 Colleen Miller as Helen Walters
 Charles Drake as Johnny Williams Walters
 Rod Taylor as Mike Randall
 Josephine Hutchinson as Mrs. Sarah Walters
 Jocelyn Brando as Lily Kirby
 Alan Dexter as Roy the photographer
 Ricky Kelman as Doug Walters

Production
At one stage Ross Hunter was going to produce and Donna Reed was going to star.

See also
 List of American films of 1958

References

External links
 
 
 

1958 films
Film noir
1958 crime drama films
American black-and-white films
Universal Pictures films
American crime drama films
Films directed by Harry Keller
1950s English-language films
1950s American films